This is a list of popular collectables.

Advertising collectables 
 Match-related items
 Premiums
 Radio premiums
 Prizes
 Bazooka Joe comics from Bazooka bubble gum
 Cereal box prizes
 Crater Critters
 Cracker Jack prizes
 Pin-back buttons

Brands
 Beanie Babies
 Coca-Cola
 Disneyana
 Disney pin trading
 Steiff teddy bears
 Swarovski figurines
 Zippo lighters

Books and periodicals 
 Books
 First editions
 Comic books

Cards 
 Artist trading cards
 Collectible card games
 Phone cards
 Trading cards
 Insert cards
 Non-sports trading cards
 For sports cards, see #Sports

Clothing and accessories, fabric and textiles
 Buttons
 Handbags
 Patches (also badges)
 Sneakers

Coins, currency, and stamps
 Numismatics
 Coins
 Paper currency and banknotes
 Stamps
 First day covers
 Postmarks
 Stock and bond certificates

Ephemera 
Ephemera is transitory written and printed matter not intended to be retained or preserved.
 Autographs
 Film posters
 Cheese labels

Film and television
 Film memorabilia
 Film posters

Music
 Vintage guitars
 Records

Nature
 Insects, including butterflies
 Seashells
 Chemical elements
 Eggs
 Fossils
 Minerals
 Plants
 Rocks

Sports 
 Sports memorabilia
 Autographed baseballs
 Sports cards
Baseball cards
 Basketball cards
 Football cards
 Hockey cards
 Jersey cards

Toys, games, and dolls
 Barbie dolls
 Beanie Babies
 Bobbleheads
 Casino chips
 Collectible card games
 Pez dispensers

Transportation
 Automobilia
 Classic cars
 Vintage cars
 Bicycles
 Petroliana, collectibles associated with the petroleum industry

Other
 Antiques
 Breweriana, objects associated with breweries
 Beer cans
 Knives
 Militaria, military items
 Murderabilia, collectibles related to murders, homicides, the perpetrators or other violent crimes
 Nazi memorabilia
 Police memorabilia
 Scouting memorabilia

References

See also 
 Funko, an American company that manufactures collectibles

List of collectibles
Entertainment lists